Jennie Ilene Litvack (1963–2019) was a Canadian  economist who worked at the World Bank.  From an early age, she was an enthusiastic trumpet player and was taught by Dizzy Gillespie, who considered her his god-daughter.  She became proficient at blowing the ceremonial Jewish horn – the shofar – and became its Mistress (ba’alat tekiya) for Adas Israel in Washington.

References

1963 births
2019 deaths
Canadian women economists
Natural horn players
Canadian trumpeters
World Bank people